Radium is an unincorporated community in Jones County, Texas, United States.

References

Unincorporated communities in Jones County, Texas
Unincorporated communities in Texas